

Philipp Kleffel (9 December 1887  – 10 October 1964) was a German general during World War II who commanded several corps. He was a recipient of the Knight's Cross of the Iron Cross of Nazi Germany.

For 10 days, Kleffel served as the last commander of the short-lived 25th Army in the Netherlands, until it was converted on 7 April 1945 to the Netherlands High Command (Oberbefehlshaber Niederlande), under Generaloberst Johannes Blaskowitz. Kleffell was part of the general staff when Blaskowitz surrendered OB Niederlande to I Canadian Corps' Lieutenant-General Charles Foulkes at Wageningen on 6 May 1945, effectively ending the war in the Netherlands.

Awards and decorations

 Knight's Cross of the Iron Cross on 17 February 1942 as Generalleutnant and commander of 1. Infanterie-Division

References

Citations

Bibliography

 

1887 births
1964 deaths
Military personnel from Poznań
People from the Province of Posen
German Army generals of World War II
Generals of Cavalry (Wehrmacht)
German Army personnel of World War I
Prussian Army personnel
Recipients of the clasp to the Iron Cross, 1st class
Recipients of the Gold German Cross
Recipients of the Knight's Cross of the Iron Cross
Recipients of the Order of the Cross of Liberty, 1st Class
German prisoners of war in World War II held by the United Kingdom
Reichswehr personnel
20th-century Freikorps personnel